One of Our Dinosaurs is Missing is a 1975 comedy film set in the early 1920s, about the theft of a dinosaur skeleton from the Natural History Museum. The film was produced by Walt Disney Productions and released by Buena Vista Distribution Company. The title is a parody of the film title One of Our Aircraft Is Missing, in which both Peter Ustinov and Hugh Burden also appeared. The film was based on the 1970 novel The Great Dinosaur Robbery by David Forrest (pseudonym of David Eliades and Robert Forrest Webb).

Plot
Escaping from China with a microfilm of the formula for the mysterious "Lotus X", Lord Edward Southmere, a King's Messenger, is chased by a group of Chinese spies.

Back in London, Lord Southmere manages to escape from a chauffeur who is trying to kidnap him, and then runs into the Natural History Museum. Chinese spies, led by Hnup Wan, follow him, so he hides the microfilm in the bones of one of the large dinosaur skeletons. He is relieved to meet his former nanny, Hettie, in the museum, and asks her to retrieve the microfilm. Southmere then faints and is captured by the Chinese, who tell Hettie and Emily (another nanny) that they are taking him to a doctor.

Hettie and Emily enlist other nannies to help them search. They hide in the mouth of the blue whale display until after closing time, and then begin looking over the skeleton of a Brontosaurus. They are unsuccessful and most of them have to return home to care for their children, but Hettie, Emily, and their friend Susan remain to continue with the search. They are captured and taken to the spies' London headquarters, underneath a Chinese restaurant in Soho. The nannies are locked up in the "dungeon", with Lord Southmere, but are able to outwit their captors and escape.

Meanwhile, the spies have decided to steal the dinosaur, so they can search it properly. That night, they trick their way into the museum. The three nannies follow on a motorbike and sidecar and watch from the shadows. After the Chinese load the Brontosaurus skeleton on the back of their steam lorry, the nannies steal the vehicle. The spies give chase through the foggy streets of London in their charabanc and a Daimler limousine, but the nannies drive into a railway-goods yard, onto a flat wagon at the back of a train, and are carried off to safety.

The nannies fail to find the microfilm on the skeleton. Meanwhile, back in London, Hettie's two young charges, Lord Castlebury and his younger brother, Truscott, have been captured by the spies. They inform the spies about the possibility that what they are looking for is on another dinosaur skeleton.  The spies go to the museum and the Wan finds the microfilm from the other large dinosaur, a Diplodocus skeleton. Wan promptly pays the boys off and lets them go. They tell Hettie the news.

Realising that Lord Southmere is now in danger, Hettie organises a rescue. Hettie and her team of nannies invade the Chinese restaurant base and battle with the spies over Lord Southmere. Meanwhile, Emily and Susan return with the Brontosaurus skeleton by crashing the lorry into the restaurant. Southmere is given the microfilm and he shows Wan what is in the microfilm, a simple recipe of wonton soup. Southmere explains that he tried explaining he was a mere businessman and that the microfilm was a recipe. Realising the error of his ways, Wan advertises the soup in the microfilm recipe and makes peace with the nannies.

Cast

Derek Nimmo as Lord Southmere
Hugh Burden as Haines
Bernard Bresslaw as Fan Choy
Helen Hayes as Hettie
Joan Sims as Emily
Deryck Guyler as Harris
Peter Ustinov as Hnup Wan
Clive Revill as Quon
Molly Weir as Scots nanny
Andrew Dove as Lord Castleberry
Max Harris as Truscott
Max Wall as Juggler
Natasha Pyne as Susan
Joss Ackland as B.J. Spence
Arthur Howard as Thumley
Roy Kinnear as Superintendent Grubbs
Leonard Trolley as Inspector Eppers
Joe Ritchie as Cabbie

Percy Herbert as Mr. Gibbons
Joan Hickson as Mrs. Gibbons
John Laurie as Jock
Angus Lennie as Hamish
Jon Pertwee as Colonel
Kathleen Byron as Colonel's wife
Lucy Griffiths as Amelia
Aimée Delamain as Millicent
John Bardon as Bookmaker
Jane Lapotaire as Miss Prescott
Richard Pearson as Sir Geoffrey
Michael Elwyn as Haycock
Anthony Sharp as Home Secretary
Wensley Pithey as Bromley
Frank Williams as Dr. Freemo
Peter Madden as Sanders
Erik Chitty as Museum guard
Amanda Barrie as Mrs. B.J. Spence

About the book
The book on which the film was based, The Great Dinosaur Robbery, was aimed at an adult audience by its authors, Robert Forrest Webb and David Eliades, and was set in New York. The authors, both very experienced UK national journalists and best-selling authors, extensively researched material in New York and were greatly assisted by the American Museum of Natural History, which is situated alongside Central Park, and by the New York Police Department responsible for that area. The authors were disappointed that the humour of the film was aimed at a very much younger audience than that in the book, which had been published, in several languages, extremely successfully throughout Europe and also in Australia, New Zealand, and the U.S.

Production
This film was made on location in England at Elstree Studios and Pinewood Studios, along with location shoots at London Zoo, the Natural History Museum, and around Windsor and Holyport Green, Maidenhead.
The Diplodocus skeleton model was later used in Star Wars Episode IV: A New Hope, in the opening scenes in the Tunisian desert.
 Whilst this film was in production, Bernard Bresslaw and Joan Sims also appeared in Carry On Behind, another film being made at Pinewood Studios alongside it.

References

External links
 
 
 
 
 One of Our Dinosaurs Is Missing - Time Out Film

1970s comedy mystery films
1975 films
American comedy mystery films
British comedy mystery films
Films about dinosaurs
1970s English-language films
Films based on British novels
Films directed by Robert Stevenson
Films produced by Bill Walsh (producer)
Films scored by Ron Goodwin
Films set in England
Films set in London
Films set in museums
Films set in the 1920s
Films shot at Pinewood Studios
Films shot in England
British neo-noir films
1970s spy comedy films
Walt Disney Pictures films
1975 comedy films
Apatosaurinae
1970s American films
1970s British films
Films shot at Elstree Studios